Ġ.F. Abela Junior College, commonly known as the Junior College (JC), is a further education college in Msida, Malta, which prepares students for the Matriculation Certificate. It was established in 1995 by the University of Malta. It is named after the 17th-century Maltese historian Giovanni Francesco Abela.

Students may choose from a range of subjects and must take two subjects at Advanced Level, three at Intermediate Level, as well as Systems of Knowledge. Since the college forms part of the University of Malta, students are able to become familiar with the University campus. College and university students collaborate on cultural projects such as concerts, drama, sport, student exchanges, debates and seminars.

The Junior College is housed in a Modernist building which was constructed between 1962 and 1966 as the Malta College of Arts, Science and Technology to designs of Victor Anastasi.

College Board
The college is governed by a board composed of:
 The rector of the University of Malta, or his delegate as chairman
 The principal
 The vice principal
 The five area co-ordinators
 Two members representing the academic staff
 Two members representing the students
 Two members appointed by the Minister of Education
 Three members appointed by the Senate of the University from the Humanities area, the Sciences area and a student representative on Senate
 The chairman of the MATSEC Board.
 The secretary

References

Schools in Malta
Msida
Modernist architecture in Malta
School buildings completed in 1966
Educational institutions established in 1995
1995 establishments in Malta
University of Malta